Katharina Förster (born 6 November 1988) is a German freestyle skier. She competed in the 2018 Winter Olympics in the moguls event.

References

1988 births
Living people
Freestyle skiers at the 2018 Winter Olympics
German female freestyle skiers
Olympic freestyle skiers of Germany
21st-century German women